Xiangling is a town of Xiangfen County, Shanxi, China. , it had 29 villages under its administration:
Jingtou Village
Zhongxing Village
Dongjie Village
Beijie Village
Nanjie Village
Xijie Village
Zhuangtou Village
Zhonghe Village
Xiangyang Village
Hebei Village
Xiyuan Village
Dongyuan Village
Gonggu Village
Tunnan Village
Tunda Village
Li Village
Langquan Village
Xue Village
Jing Village
Xiyang Village
Huangya Village
Xuliu Village
Nantaichai Village
Beitaichai Village
Nanchai Village
Hu Village
Shuangfu Village
Sizhu Village
Qi Village

See also
List of township-level divisions of Shanxi

References

Township-level divisions of Shanxi
Xiangfen County